The Arabian cobra (Naja arabica) is a species of venomous snake in the family Elapidae. The species is endemic to the Arabian Peninsula.

Etymology and Taxonomy
Naja arabica is classified under the genus Naja of the family Elapidae. It was first described by an Italian herpetologist,  Giuseppe Scortecci in 1932. The generic name Naja is a Latinisation of the Sanskrit word , meaning "cobra”. The specific epithet arabica means “of Arabia” or “Arabic”.

This species, Naja arabica, had long been considered a subspecies of the Egyptian cobra (Naja haje), but morphological and genetic differences have led to its recognition as a separate species.

Distribution
The Arabian cobra is found in western Oman, southwestern Saudi Arabia, and throughout Yemen.

The Photo Ark
 In November 2021, National Geographic announced that the Arabian cobra was the milestone 12,000th animal photographed for The Photo Ark.

References

Further reading
Scortecci G (1932). "Rettili dello Yemen ". Atti della Società Italiana di Scienze Naturali e del Museo Civico di Storia Naturale in Milano 71: 39–49. (Naja haje arabica, new subspecies, pp. 47–49). (in Italian).

Naja
Reptiles of the Arabian Peninsula
Reptiles described in 1932